Bernardino de Mendoza (Granada, 1501 – Saint-Quentin 1557), was a Spanish aristocrat from the House of Mendoza and Captain General of the Galleys of Spain.

He was the third son of Íñigo López de Mendoza y Quiñones, 1st Marquis of Mondéjar and Francesca Pacheco. His siblings were Luis, Maria, Antonio and Diego Hurtado.

Early days of naval career

Bernardino was destined for a career in the Spanish Navy. Already in his youth, he sailed with two galleys to fight the Barbary corsairs in the Mediterranean Sea, at his own expense.
In October 1525, he participated in the failed attempt to reconquer Peñón de Vélez de la Gomera, led by his brother Luis Hurtado de Mendoza y Pacheco, 2nd Marquis of Mondéjar and Captain General of Granada.

Captain General of the Galleys of Spain

In 1533, he became Captain General of the Galleys of Spain. In 1535 he led twelve galleys, some of them previously captured from the Turks, to take part in the Conquest of Tunis (1535). He remained in Tunis, to defend the fortress of La Goleta at the head of 1,000 Spanish troops. He returned to sea with six galleys, but was recalled to La Goleta to prevent the unpaid and mutinous Spanish garrison from selling the fortress to the Turks. He sailed them to Sicily with a promise of payment. When they were not paid there either, the troops caused problems in Sicily.

In 1540, Bernardino gained an important victory in the Battle of Alborán, crushing superior Turkish forces. He was injured at the head and partially lost control of the use of his arms. One year later, he led 15 galleys in the failed Algiers expedition. In 1550, he won another important battle against the Turks, when he took Mahdiye.

Foreign wars and his death

In 1555, he was temporarily Viceroy of Naples because Cardinal Pedro Pacheco de Villena attended the Papal conclave, May 1555. One year later, King Philip II of Spain made him State Councilor. Very uncomfortable at court, Bernardino soon left for Flanders to fight under Emmanuel Philibert, Duke of Savoy against the French.

After the Battle of St. Quentin (1557), he was charged with reinforcing the city's defences, but he died soon after from his wounds received in the battle.

Marriage and children 

He married Elvira Carrillo y Córdoba and had at least 5 children : 
 Juan Hurtado de Mendoza y Carrillo, also Captain General of the galleys and commander of La Goleta. Died in the naval disaster of La Herradura (1562).
 Catalina, married Luis Hurtado de Mendoza, 4th Marquis of Mondéjar.

Sources 

 The article in the Spanish Wikipedia
 Los Mendoza: el marino Bernardino de Mendoza (in Spanish)

1501 births
1557 deaths
Spanish untitled nobility
Spanish naval officers
Viceroys of Naples